Henry (Hennie) Bosman is a South African karate instructor, ex–world karate champion, stunt man and actor. He is sometimes known as Henie Bosman. He owns a karate school in Bellville, Western Cape.

Roots
Bosman was born on 24 May 1956  in Bellville, Western Cape, South Africa. He graduated from Bellville High School.

Karate career
He started training karate in 1965 at the age of 9. He was the national champion in Kata and Kumite. He was the world senior Karate champion in 2001. That was held in Osaka, Japan. For a long period he was a 7th Dan; called Shihan (七段).  He now holds the rank of 8th Dan; called Hachidan (八段 ). He is the chairman of Kyokushin Africa.

Personal life
Bosman’s father was a cyclist and his mother a discus field athlete. Before making karate and the instruction thereof a career he was a detective sergeant in the South African Police Force. He is married to Hayley Ruth Williams and has two children. He was involved in scheduling a diplomatic parliamentarian meeting between Russia and Japan. He is also a motorracing driver.

Filmography

Stuntman appearances

Actor appearances

References

People from Bellville, South Africa
1956 births
Living people
South African male film actors
South African stunt performers
South African male karateka
Kyokushin kaikan practitioners